Château Saint-Rémy d'Altenstadt is a ruined castle in the commune of Wissembourg, in the department of Bas-Rhin, Alsace, France. It was one of the four castles protecting the Wissembourg Abbey. It is a listed historical monument since 1989.

References

Ruined castles in Bas-Rhin
Monuments historiques of Bas-Rhin